Muschampia is a Palearctic genus of spread-winged skippers in the family Hesperiidae.

Species 
These species belong to the genus Muschampia:
 Muschampia alta (Schwingenschuss, 1942) Southern Italy, Balkan Peninsula
 Muschampia antonia (Speyer, 1879) Central Asia, Kazakhstan, Afghanistan, north Tibet
 Muschampia baeticus (Rambur, 1840)
 Muschampia cribrellum (Eversmann, 1841) (spinose skipper)
 Muschampia dravira (Moore, [1875])
 Muschampia floccifera (Zeller, 1847)
 Muschampia gigas (Bremer, 1864) east China, Amur Oblast
 Muschampia kuenlunus (Grum-Grshimailo, 1893) Central Asia (Alay Mountains, west Pamirs, Tian-Shan).
 Muschampia lavatherae (Esper, 1783)
 Muschampia leuzeae (Oberthür, 1881)
 Muschampia lutulentus (Grum-Grshimailo, 1887) Syria, Mesopotamia to Central Asia, Afghanistan
 Muschampia mohammed (Oberthür, 1887)
 Muschampia musta Evans, 1949 Afghanistan
 Muschampia nobilis (Staudinger, 1882) Central Asian mountain ranges
 Muschampia nomas (Lederer, 1855) Israel
 Muschampia orientalis (Reverdin, 1913)
 Muschampia plurimacula (Christoph, 1893) Hyrcania
 Muschampia poggei (Lederer, 1858) Asia Minor, Mesopotamia to Middle East, Transcaucasia
 Muschampia prometheus (Grum-Grshimailo, 1890) Central Asian mountain ranges
 Muschampia proteides (F.Wagner,1929) Central Asia (Alai, Ghissarsky, Tian-Shan), Afghanistan 
 Muschampia proteus (Staudinger, 1886)
 Muschampia protheon (Rambur, 1858) central China (Kuku-Noor), east Mongolia to Transbaikalia
 Muschampia proto Ochsenheimer, 1808 (sage skipper)
 Muschampia stauderi (Reverdin, 1913)
 Muschampia staudingeri (Speyer, 1879) northeast Iran to Pamirs, Turkmenistan, Altai, west China
 Muschampia tersa Evans, 1949 Transcaucasia, Iran, Iraq
 Muschampia tessellum (Hübner, [1800-1803]) (tesselated skipper)

References

Natural History Museum Lepidoptera genus database

External links
 
 
 Images representing Muschampia at Consortium for the Barcode of Life

 
Hesperiidae genera
Taxa named by J. W. Tutt